My First Alphabet is an educational game for the Atari 8-bit family of home computers. It was programmed by Fernando Herrera and published by the Atari Program Exchange in 1981. The game won the first Atari Star Award and was moved to Atari Inc.'s product line. The award led to the creation of First Star Software and a string of games from Herrera.

Development

Herrera's son, Steve, was born with severe cataracts and was pronounced blind by medical specialists. Refusing to place his son in remedial classes, Herrera wrote a program to help his son learn the alphabet. After several months, his son made rapid progress, overcoming his handicap. The program later evolved into My First Alphabet.

Reception
When Atari began recognizing the top APX submissions in 1981, My First Alphabet was the first Atari Star Award winner, including a $25,000 prize. Herrera used the money to found First Star Software. Herrerra wrote First Star's initial title, Astro Chase (1982), as well as  Bristles (1983). First Star was the publisher of Boulder Dash (1984) and Spy vs. Spy (1984).

External links
atariarchives.org - Description of APX software
atarimania.com Review - My First Alphabet
Atari HQ - "Fernando Herrera" - First Star in the Atari Universe

1981 video games
Atari Program Exchange software
Atari 8-bit family games
Atari 8-bit family-only games
Children's educational video games
Video games developed in the United States
Single-player video games